Edmund Addo (born 17 May 2000) is a Ghanaian professional footballer who plays as a midfielder for Serbian SuperLiga club Spartak Subotica and the Ghana national team.

Club career

FK Senica
Addo made his Fortuna Liga debut for Senica against AS Trenčín on 16 February 2019. Addo was fielded as a late replacement for Eric Ramírez, in an effor to salvage something out of this away fixture played in Myjava. Senica was two down after goals by Čataković and Ubbink but Paur had struck a third goal, finalising the score of the match to 3–0.

Sheriff Tiraspol
On 14 July 2021, Sheriff Tiraspol announced the signing of Addo. In his first season, he played 34 matches including six in the UEFA Champions League and one in the Europa League as Sheriff won the double, the Moldovan National Division and the Moldovan Cup.

Spartak Subotica
Following speculation on his possible transfer to Red Star Belgrade, on 10 January 2023 Addo joined fellow Serbian side Spartak Subotica, signing a contract until June 2025 with the club.

International career
Addo made his debut for Ghana national team on 11 November 2021 in a World Cup qualifier against Ethiopia. He was part of the final 28-man squad named for the 2021 African Cup of Nations (AFCON) in Cameroon.

Honours 
Sheriff Tiraspol
 Moldovan National Division: 2021–22
 Moldovan Cup: 2021–22

References

External links
 FK Senica official club profile
 Futbalnet profile
 
 

2000 births
Living people
Ghanaian footballers
Association football midfielders
Ghana international footballers
FK Senica players
FC Sheriff Tiraspol players
Slovak Super Liga players
Moldovan Super Liga players
Ghanaian expatriate footballers
Ghanaian expatriate sportspeople in Slovakia
Expatriate footballers in Slovakia
Ghanaian expatriate sportspeople in Moldova
Expatriate footballers in Moldova
2021 Africa Cup of Nations players